Ian McLachlan is a Canadian writer and academic who lives in Peterborough, Ontario, Canada.  Best known for his novel The Seventh Hexagram, which was co-winner with Michael Ondaatje's Coming Through Slaughter of the inaugural Books in Canada First Novel Award in 1976 and a finalist for the Governor General's Award for English-language fiction at the 1976 Governor General's Awards.

After earning a Master of Arts at Oxford University in 1960, McLachlan established the department of comparative literature at the University of Hong Kong before joining the faculty of Trent University in 1970. Before his retirement, McLachlan served as the chair of Cultural Studies department for over 14 years.  After The Seventh Hexagram, he published a second novel, Helen in Exile, in 1980.

He has been a prominent figure in the arts and culture of Peterborough, Ontario. His activities have included founding the local publishing company Ordinary Press, serving on the boards of the city's Artspace and Union Theatre, and founding and programming for the Canadian Images Film Festival. With the film festival, he was fined in 1983 for screening A Message from Our Sponsor, a documentary film about subliminal advertising, without approval from the Ontario Censor Board.

As a playwright, his works have included Pioneer Chainsaw Massacre, Postscript, Lear One/One, Frankenstein Meets the Recession, The Orchard, Doctor Barnardo's Children and Wounded Soldiers. His non-fiction works have included Shanghai 1949 and In the Margins of the Empire: Reading Cambodia.

Works
The Seventh Hexagram (1976)
Helen in Exile (1980)
Shanghai 1949 (1989), with Sam Tata
Lear One/One (1990)
In the Margins of the Empire: Reading Cambodia (1993)
The General and the Mother (1995)
Crow Hill (1997), with Robert Winslow
The Orchard (1998), with Robert Winslow
Dr Barnardo's Children (2005), with Robert Winslow
Ho Chi Minh in Prison (2010)
Wounded Soldiers (2013), with Robert Winslow

References

External links
Ian McLachlan

Canadian male novelists
20th-century Canadian novelists
20th-century Canadian poets
Canadian male poets
20th-century Canadian dramatists and playwrights
21st-century Canadian poets
21st-century Canadian dramatists and playwrights
Writers from Ontario
People from Peterborough, Ontario
Academic staff of Trent University
Alumni of the University of Oxford
Living people
Canadian male dramatists and playwrights
20th-century Canadian male writers
21st-century Canadian male writers
Year of birth missing (living people)
Amazon.ca First Novel Award winners